The AO-35 is a prototype assault rifle of Soviet origin. The weapon is an AK-47 derivative using a laminated wood stock to decrease its weight.

A 5.45×39mm version existed; it entered the 1968 trials for the new 5.45×39mm assault rifle, but it was rejected; ultimately the AK-74 was adopted for this role some years later.

References

See also
List of assault rifles

7.62×39mm assault rifles
Kalashnikov derivatives
Trial and research firearms of the Soviet Union
Assault rifles of the Soviet Union